Fossarina legrandi, common name Legrand's top shell, is a species of very small sea snail, a marine gastropod mollusc or micromollusk in the family Trochidae, the top snails.

Description
The shell grows to a length of 5 mm. The small, thin shell has a depressed globose shape. It is highly polished, translucent and rich brown. The minute spire contains 2½ whorls and is very little elevated. The suture is much impressed. The aperture is inflately lunate. It is tinged white and faintly dilate at the inner portion.

Distribution 
This marine species is endemic to Australia and occurs off New South Wales, South Australia, Tasmania, Victoria and Western Australia.

References

 Tate, R. & May, W.L. 1901. A revised census of the marine Mollusca of Tasmania. Proceedings of the Linnean Society of New South Wales 26(3): 344-471
 Pritchard, G.B. & Gatliff, J.H. 1902. Catalogue of the marine shells of Victoria. Part V. Proceedings of the Royal Society of Victoria 14(2): 85-138
 Verco, J.C. 1908. Notes on South Australian marine Mollusca with descriptions of new species. Part IX. Transactions of the Royal Society of South Australia 32: 338-361
 May, W.L. 1921. A Checklist of the Mollusca of Tasmania. Hobart, Tasmania : Government Printer 114 pp
 May, W.L. 1923. An Illustrated Index of Tasmanian Shells. Hobart : Government Printer 100 pp
 Iredale, T. 1924. Results from Roy Bell's molluscan collections. Proceedings of the Linnean Society of New South Wales 49(3): 179-279, pl. 33-36
 Cotton, B.C. 1959. South Australian Mollusca. Archaeogastropoda. Handbook of the Flora and Fauna of South Australia. Adelaide : South Australian Government Printer 449 pp.
 Iredale, T. & McMichael, D.F. 1962. A reference list of the marine Mollusca of New South Wales. Memoirs of the Australian Museum 11: 1-109
 Macpherson, J.H. & Gabriel, C.J. 1962. Marine Molluscs of Victoria. Melbourne : Melbourne University Press & National Museum of Victoria 475 pp
 Wilson, B. 1993. Australian Marine Shells. Prosobranch Gastropods. Kallaroo, Western Australia : Odyssey Publishing Vol. 1 408 pp.
 Grove, S. 2011. The Seashells of Tasmania: A Comprehensive Guide. Taroona, Australia: Taroona Publications. [vi], 81

External links
 Petterd, W. F. (1879). New species of Tasmanian marine shells. Journal of Conchology. 2: 102-105

legrandi
Gastropods of Australia
Gastropods described in 1879